"Stay" is a song by German DJ/production team Sash! featuring American singer La Trec. It was released on 26 September 1997 as the fourth and final single from their debut album, It's My Life – The Album (1997). The song topped the dance charts in both Canada and the United States and reached the top 20 in more than 10 European countries, Australia, and New Zealand. On the Eurochart Hot 100, "Stay" peaked at number six and in the UK, it was Sash!'s third consecutive number-two single.

Critical reception
The song was universally acclaimed across the music press. Scottish newspaper Aberdeen Press and Journal viewed it as "Sash’s better effort". Jon O'Brien from AllMusic noted the "dramatic" spoken word intro, describing the song as "an epic slice of soulful Hi-NRG pop". Larry Flick from Billboard wrote, "The time has come for this internationally acclaimed producer/musician to finally crack the pop charts. By drafting the belting skills of La Trec for this rare vocal track from his fine album, "It's My Life", he offers his most viable mainstream contender to date. The track thumps with Euro-NRG intensity, while a swirl of colorful synths fleshes out the song's simple yet wickedly infectious melody. La Trec, a singer to keep a close eye on, struts across the groove with enough force to please clubheads, but with the sweet allure that popsters require." A reviewer from Music Week rated "Stay" four out of five, declaring it "another trancey house stomper. Built around the gospel-like uplifting vocals of San Francisco-born La Trec." The magazine's Alan Jones constated that Sash! "are likely to get, their third consecutive smash", complimenting the singer's "gutsy femme vocal".

Chart performance
"Stay" was very successful on the charts on several continents and remains one of Sash!'s biggest hits to date. It made it to number one on both the Canadian RPM Dance/Urban chart and the US Billboard Hot Dance Club Play chart. In Europe, the single climbed into the top 10 in Belgium, Denmark, Finland, Hungary, Ireland, Italy, Lithuania, the Netherlands, Norway, and the United Kingdom, as well as on the Eurochart Hot 100. In the UK, "Stay" reached number two during its first week on the UK Singles Chart, on October 12, 1997. Additionally, it was a top-20 hit in Germany, Sweden and Switzerland. In Oceania, it peaked at number 12 in New Zealand and number 24 in Australia. The single earned a gold record in Belgium, Norway and the United Kingdom.

Music video
The music video for "Stay" was directed by Oliver Sommer. On MTV Europe some scenes in the video was left out from the original music video. Sommer also directed the music video for "Encore une fois". "Stay" was uploaded to YouTube in October 2016. As of September 2020, the video 
has got more than 6.9 million views.

Track listings

 German 12-inch single
A1. "Stay" (original 12-inch)  – 5:54
A2. "Stay" (Exit EEE remix)  – 5:53
B1. "Stay" (Magnificent 4 remix)  – 6:01
B2. "Stay" (2 Phunky People remix)  – 5:54

 German 12-inch remix single
A1. "Stay" (Armand van Helden remix 1)  – 7:34
A2. "Stay" (Armand van Helden remix 2)  – 7:41
B1. "Stay" (Exit EEE's Fly So High dub)  – 6:15
B2. "Stay" (Boris & Beck remix)  – 7:10

 German maxi-CD single
 "Stay" (single edit)  – 3:29
 "Stay" (original 12-inch)  – 5:54
 "Stay" (Exit-Eee remix)  – 5:53
 "Stay" (Magnificent 4 remix)  – 6:01
 "Stay" (2 Phunky People remix)  – 5:54

 UK CD1
 "Stay" (original single edit)  – 3:29
 "Stay" (Armand van Helden Remix)  – 7:25
 "Stay" (Exit-EEE remix)  – 5:53
 "Stay" (PowerPlant "Suck This" mix)  – 7:46
 "Stay" (Loop Da Loop's vocal mix)  – 7:42

 UK CD2
 "Stay" (original single edit)  – 3:29
 "Stay" (Eat Me edit)  – 3:52
 "Stay" (The Lisa Marie Vocal Experience)  – 8:37
 "Stay" (Magnificent 4 remix)  – 6:01
 "Stay" (2 Phunky People remix)  – 5:54
 "Stay" (original 12-inch)  – 5:55

Charts and certifications

Weekly charts

Year-end charts

Certifications

Release history

References

1997 singles
1997 songs
Multiply Records singles
Music videos directed by Oliver Sommer
Sash! songs